Expeditie Robinson: 2006, was the eighth Dutch/Belgian version of the Swedish show Expedition Robinson, or Survivor as it is referred to in some countries. This season began airing on August 28, 2006 and concluded on November 20, 2006. The major twist this season was that the tribes were initially divided up by gender with one "All-Star" contestant joining each tribe. These two All-Stars were, Klaar Lippe and Robin Ibens. Though the main twist may have seemed like a repeat of twists that occurred in previous seasons, unlike previous seasons with a similar twist this  season male contestants were from Belgium and all females from the Netherlands. While the All-Star contestants weren't eligible to win, they could vote and following a tribal swap in episode 4, they could give any contestant on their tribe immunity at tribal council. Following the merge in episode 8, the twist that was "Losers Island", was introduced to the game. After a contestant was eliminated they would be sent to Losers island where they would wait until there were only two contestants left in the game at which point the six contestants on the island would vote for one of their own to return. When it came time to vote for a winner, the public, instead of a jury decided the winner. In the end, it was Olga Urashova who returned from Losers island in the final three, who won the season over Lenny Janssen with a public vote of 52% to Lenny's 48%.

Finishing order

Voting history

 As Klaar and Robin were the two returning All-Stars this season neither could win or be voted out.

 As Susanna voluntarily left the competition in episode 1, no one was eliminated at the first tribal council.

 As Matthijs voluntarily left the competition in episode 3, no one was eliminated at the second tribal council.

 When Klaar and Robin left the competition they each were allowed to grant one member of their tribe two votes at the first tribal council following the merge. Klaar chose Olga and Robin chose Ignazio.

 Bernadette had extra one black vote and one neutralizing (white) vote.

 Immediately following Ignzaio's elimination, all contestants living on Loser's island voted for one of their own to return to the game. Olga won the vote and competed against Bernadette and Lenny in the final immunity challenge of the season. Lenny won the challenge and was immune from the final vote in which contestants that had lived on Loser's island voted for who of Bernadette and Lenny they wanted to see in the final two.

 It was decided that instead of having a jury vote this season, the winner would be decided by a public vote.

External links
http://worldofbigbrother.com/Survivor/BN/8/about.shtml
https://web.archive.org/web/20100824190828/http://www.expeditie-robinson.tv/vorigeseizoenen/expeditierobinson2006/

Expeditie Robinson seasons
2006 Dutch television seasons
2006 Belgian television seasons